The Ufa-Pavillon am Nollendorfplatz was a cinema located at 4 Nollendorfplatz, Schöneberg, Berlin.  Built in 1912–13 and designed and decorated by leading artistic practitioners of the day, it was the German capital's first purpose-built, free-standing cinema Described as "historically, [...] the most important cinema in Berlin", it incorporated a number of technical innovations such as an opening roof and a daylight projection screen, and opened as the Nollendorf-Theater in March 1913.

The cinema was built by a group of US investors allied with the Italian film company Cines which included the American millionaire Joe Goldsoll (a high-class swindler and con-man); A. H. Woods, a Hungarian theatrical producer based in New York to whom Goldsoll was related by marriage; and Edward B. Kinsila, later a film studio architect. The Nollendorf-Theater was rumoured to have been "paid for by the Pope's money." One of the directors of Cines was Ernesto Pacelli, President of the Banco di Roma, who was in the confidence of Pope Leo XIII and the cousin of Pope Pius XII.

It became the Cines Nollendorf-Theater in 1914, but the Berlin branch of Cines collapsed in late 1915 after the Banco di Roma, one of its main investors, fell into financial difficulties. The building was acquired by the Union-Theater Lichtspiele (U.-T.) chain of cinemas, part of Paul Davidson's PAGU company. Although PAGU was bought in late 1917 by Universum-Film AG (Ufa), the cinema continued to be known as the Union-Theater Nollendorfplatz until 1923. It was renamed as Ufa-Theater Nollendorfplatz in 1924 and finally as the Ufa-Pavillon in 1927. It was badly damaged during World War II in an RAF bombing raid in late 1943.

Design 

The Cines Nollendorf Theater was one of a number of buildings constructed during a brief period in Berlin's industrial and public architecture from around 1900 where Historicism (represented by the Gründerzeit and the highly decorative Jugendstil movements) came to an end, to be replaced by Modern Architecture from the early 1920s onwards.

The architect was Oskar Kaufmann, one of the proponents of the so-called 'Neuberliner' architectural style, largely influenced by the work of Alfred Messel who had died in 1909:
 "In our new Berlin style—which has been cultivated by a majority of the exuberant upcoming students of Messel—the pillar that we have been lacking for so long (particularly the elongated Doric architecture) is once more finally drawn into the light of day."

The Nollendorf-Theater can be seen as an example of architectural 'Gesamtkunstwerk', a work created by a typical assemblage of masters of their craft found particularly in Germany (and less so in the United States). The films made by Ufa and other companies shown in the cinema during the 20s and 30s were also informed by this idea of an artistic guild of equals. This collective approach resulted in a flexible, dynamic and fluid group of artistically minded, highly creative and even visionary film-makers which produced many of the classic films which are still discussed and referenced in the 21st century.

The architecture of the Nollendorf-Theater is plainer and more severe than the Gründerzeit and Jugendstil styles, and embodies distinctly 'modern' sculptural and artistic motifs.

Other contemporary developments in search of "a more modern and useful architecture" for Berlin include: the AEG turbine plant by Peter Behrens (1909); Kaufmann's Volksbühne and the  introduced new trends in theatre construction (in addition to the Ufa-Pavillon and his 1914 conversion of the Groß-Berlin Theater, later the Ufa-Palast am Zoo; the Pergamon Museum and the capital's first department stores were drafted by Alfred Messel; and Hermann Muthesius designed a new and modern Country House style for Berlin's newly developing suburbs.

Description 
Edward B. Kinsila in his book Modern Theater Construction gives a (fulsome, bordering on purple prose) description of the interior of the Nollendorf.

Also, from an article in the contemporary trade journal Kinotheater:
"Opposite the 'Mozartsaal' a curious building has arisen, and the gazes of the passers-by are already steered towards the exterior, with its windowless and thus distinguished, seemingly inventive, façade. The glass paintings (illuminated from the inside) which constitute a unique decoration of the entrance, bespeak—through their symbolic figures—the building's purpose: a cinema.

At first glance the auditorium comes across as almost overwhelming. If you didn't know that it has been decked out after the American paradigm, you might suppose that you were being confronted with an entirely new style. This is something genuinely new for Berlin, and one must give Oskar Kaufmann his due, for he has understood how to bring to fruition something outstanding and appropriate to its purpose. The room, decorated in ivory colours, is completely carpeted in grey plush, against which the lilac folding seats are advantageously silhouetted. The ceiling gravitates downwards towards sumptuous, multi-coloured relief arabesques, and the light fixtures are of outstanding beauty.

The theatre contains 650 places, whose prices between 1 and 3 marks are allotted to stalls, circle and boxes. The staircase does not lead separately – like in German theatres in general – to the auditorium, but from both sides of the stalls; and (through the continuous curved arc of the balcony) generates a wholly idiosyncratic embellishment of the house. Everything is austerely modern, plain, and elegant."

The film critic of the Berlin daily  was much taken with the auditorium on the opening night:
"First, a word about the interior of the theatre: Adorable. Damped, effective light falls down through splendid bronze balls. The whole plain, sober and simple interior is delicately mauve -white; even the numerous ushers (Platzanweiser) are exceptional in their new violet tailcoat livery. All in all, a jewellery box of the very best kind."

It was not as big as the Ufa-Palast am Zoo, which soon become Berlin's premier cinema. The Ufa-Palast was also owned/leased by Goldsoll and Woods and converted in 1913 from a stage theatre by Oskar Kaufmann. The Ufa-Pavillon was seems to have been used more for press showings.

Not so Oriental
Somewhat confusingly, 'Cines' is also a native adjective in the German language, meaning 'Chinese'. However, the Cines-Theater was not a 'Chinese theatre', as at least two writers seem to believe.

Critical reception 

According to one contemporary critic, the building exhibited "the gracefully ironic pathos, the erotically overloaded sacrilege, the rhythmical dissonance of solemnity and dance", which became the key formal elements of the 'Ufa style.'

"Cinema buildings are not, at any rate, slow in arriving, and take interesting forms of great experimental significance, as is the case of Oskar Kaufmann's Cines Theater, inaugurated in 1913."

Before World War I, "Germany had led the world in the development of serious, modern cinema architecture. Oskar Kauffmann's [...] Cines-Theater in Berlin's Nollendorfplatz was one of the first significant free-standing purpose-built cinema structures. It was among the first attempts at a sober, modern language of cinema architecture, presenting an austere picture to the world with three looming blank walls ".

With its somewhat detached, intellectual, high-cultural prose, Berliner Architekturwelt briefly referred to the new cinemas in Berlin, singling out the building on the Nollendorfplatz:
"We lack the space to completely register the 'cinemas'; it should at least be mentioned that the first of this type, namely the edifice built by Oscar Kaufmann on the Nollendorfplatz has been inaugurated, and the newest scintillating Muse (albeit 'Piccadillyfied' by the imbecile name of Cines), genuinely offers an artistic home which we also think to publicise. The same artist, as is generally known, is now finishing the Theater der neuen freien Volksbühne – whose future is now assured – in the Bülowplatz in Scheunenviertel, which thereby perhaps gets away from his past.

"An early high point of the grounding phase of the film palaces was the Cines-Theater, opened in 1913, the first "free-standing building conceived solely in the interests of cinema", a "sober, grey, and particularly windowless cube."

Early history

Background 
In December 1908 a highly restrictive and monopolistic trust, the Motion Picture Patents Company (MPPC), otherwise known as the 'Edison Trust', was set up to combine the power of the major US film companies. This was particularly worrying for European film makers, since they were almost entirely excluded from the American market. They met in Paris in February 1909 to discuss sales and rental methods to get out a crisis of over-production (especially in France) and the supply of film stock (mostly made by Eastman Kodak) to the European manufacturers.

Present at the meeting was a representative of Cines ('Società Italiana Cines'), an Italian film production company based in Rome. It had opened branches in London, Paris and Barcelona by 1907, and was the distributor for the Ambrosio Film production company of Turin. Cines began to expand considerably outside Italy, making preparations for an 'escalation strategy' to spend more on film productions and film portfolios. Cines had no distributor in the US at the time, and Mario A. Stevani (director general of Cines since 1910) made a trip to the USA in March–May 1911, and signed a contract with the Edison Trust (MPPC) to sell a million meters (3 million feet) of film per year. His main contact was George Kleine, a Chicago film importer and leading member of the MPPC, who made huge profits importing foreign films into the US, using his MPPC-license to acquire the films. Kleine became the distributor of Cines films in the US, and the Marquis di Serra (one of the directors of Cines) was appointed agent in the UK.

Cines also received an injection of capital from a group of US investors, who built or acquired cinemas in Germany and elsewhere in mainland Europe, to increase their share of the marginal cinema revenues that Cines's films generated: in 1912 the Cines company of Rome had a capital of 3.75 million lire ($712,125). Among the American investors and interested parties were: F. J. "Joe" Goldsol (later Chairman of Goldwyn Pictures from 1922 to 1924); his younger brother L. H. Goldsoll, and Edward B. Kinsila; the theatrical impresarios A. H. Woods (who invested $160,000), Klaw and Erlanger, and Charles Frohman; and Pat Casey, an experienced vaudeville agent. Goldsoll was the director and general manager of the Berlin-based company Cines-Theater AG (a partly-owned subsidiary of Cines in Rome), which held the Cines rights for Germany.

Construction 

Although its exact origins are slightly unclear, the cinema seems to have been built from mid-1912 by Joe Goldsoll, a millionaire high-class con man and swindler whose Cines-Theater AG company owned the rights to Cines films in Germany. He appears (as F. J. Goldsoll) as its owner ('Eigentümer)' in the 1913 Berlin address book. Goldsoll, as the main financial backer, was joined by A. H. Woods, a Hungarian theatrical producer based in New York, whose interest in films and cinemas seems to have begun with his involvement with the 1912 film The Miracle, produced by Joseph Menchen. Al. Woods's wife was Goldsoll's cousin.

The late owner of the previous building on the new cinema's site was Baron Rudolf von Renvers, von Bülow's doctor and confidant, who died in 1909. The deal to build the cinema was promoted by the slightly unusual Edward B. Kinsila, at the time a London-based American property developer: he later became a cinema and film studio designer in the US.

Goldsoll, "a non-combatant in show-things", with Al.

One of the first mentions of the new cinema appeared in the Moving Picture World in October 1912:
"Projection Department: From Berlin"
Mr. Edward B. Kinsila, Nollendorf Theater, Berlin, Germany, writes:
"I am building here what I hope will be the finest cinematograph theater in the world, and naturally I want to give the very best picture. The auditorium will be lighted during the showing of the picture, and the screen placed back on a thoroughly darkened stage about 18 feet from the proscenium opening. The throw will be made through the auditorium onto the screen, a distance of about 70 feet. It is my understanding that the best light effect is produced where the amperage is high and the voltage low, or the reverse. Will you be good enough to tell me just what voltage and amperage of direct current will be the very best? I can use up to 220 volts, and any amperage I like. I have no desire to economize on the light. I want the best effect, that is all."

In December 1912 Kinsila (or Kinsella) claimed to be associated with Goldsoll in the building of the new cinema:

"Berlin's finest and newest cinematograph playhouse, the Nollendorf Theater, which is about to open its doors, is the creation and property of two Americans, the Messrs. Goldsoll and Kinsella. The building, which is like a Greek temple, is architecturally one of the most striking structures in the Kaiser's capital, and does much to beautify the big Nollendorf Platz, on which it stands.
The new theatre contains one feature which is an absolute novelty in German picture-houses, namely, that it does not require to be darkened while the films are being shown. Its domed roof is also an innovation, as it is built to be removed in summer, and during other propitious weather, so at night the spectators have nothing above them but the starlit heavens."

It was also the first cinema with a sloping floor and the seating in a fan-shaped arrangement. However, by the time the Nollendorf-Theater opened in March 1913 Kinsila seems to have left the scene, and it was being reported as the "creation and property of F. J. Goldsoll and Al. Woods."

Opening 

The inauguration on 19 March 1913 of this "palace of unheard-of luxury" made a "genuine sensation." The evening began with a dithyrambic speech in praise of the cinema (the Kintopp) by Hanns Heinz Ewers, one of the most outspoken pro-Autorenfilm literati.

The main attraction, however, was the German première of the Cines blockbuster epic of Ancient Rome Quo Vadis?, to which Woods and Goldsoll controlled the German rights. Woods also owned the worldwide rights outside the US, where the rights were controlled by George Kleine. Like the presentation of the film of The Miracle in London and New York (to which Woods also owned the rights), Quo Vadis? also featured live actors in the auditorium to reinforce some scenes: "special mobs" were organised by Ryszard Ordynski (Richard Ardinski), Max Reinhardt's manager at the Deutsches Theater, who had stage-managed performances of The Miracle (play) in London in 1911–12, and later in Vienna in 1914. There was an orchestra of about twenty-five men and a full line of sound effects. The orchestra was hidden behind a balustrade between the audience and the screen.

The theatre manager Jacob J. Rosenthal, visiting Berlin, wrote that "Quo Vadis is creating a furore in Berlin though it has been very badly mutilated by the censor, who doesn't seem to offer much objection to the risqué or even the immoral, but who strenuously objects to fights or violence. You can imagine what happened to Quo Vadis.

The critic of the Berlin newspaper  was more enthusiastic about Ewers' speech than the film which followed:
 "With his optimism Evers is not wrong: simply, the cinema's victorious career will reach a very different goal than is given to it today. Not entertainment, but instruction will be the main attraction of cinema in the future. Individual scenes were animated by singing, applause, etc., which can be described as partly successful."

The critic Ferdinand Kiss was especially vitriolic about the whole affair:
At the Nollendorfplatz in Berlin, a new cinema has been let loose upon humanity. The opening film: Quo Vadis, or the persecution of Berliners by Nero in anno 1913. [...] And to outdo all that has gone before – within the film, and in general – one reaches to a desperate medium. What flickers up yonder? Is it Nielsen? Perhaps Lindner? Or even Nauke? No, it's Ewers [ ... ], "the cinema's most fervent advocate, who consecrated the newly opened movie-house by means of a dithyrambic speech." In all other respects, it's downhill too. Fate has ordained filming and Ewers. [ ... ] How will it all end? We want to experience Nauke and see only the flickering Ewers instead."

According to one report, the Nollendorf-Theater and the Cines-Palast am Zoo, where Quo Vadis? also showed, were each taking about 4,500 marks ($1,000) a night with 'Quo Vadis,' giving two performances nightly but no matinees.

Siegfried Kracauer, writing in 1947, was evidently unaware of the live element incorporated into the film show:
"Despite the evolution of domestic production, foreign films continued to flood German movie theaters, which had considerably increased in number since 1912. A new Leipzig Lichtspiel palace was inaugurated with Quo Vadis, an Italian pageant that actually received press reviews as if it were a real stage play."

Kracauer is referring here to the opening night of the Königspavillon-Theater on Promenadestrasse, Leipzig (lessees, Goldsoll & Woods), on Thursday 24 April 1913 with Quo Vadis?, complete with real actors and a prologue (probably spoken by the "flickering Ewers"). This seems to be exactly the same show as on the opening night of the Nollendorf-Theater in Berlin in March 1913.

The house manager of the Cines-Theater in 1913 and 1914 was the stage actor Valy Arnheim, later a film director and actor.

Later history 
By the end of May 1913 the cinema had been renamed the Cines Nollendorf Theater.

After the success of Quo Vadis?, Woods and Goldsoll opened a large chain of theatres in Germany, France, Belgium and the Netherlands, many for Kinovaudeville shows. They leased fourteen houses in Germany, including six in Berlin; the second of these after the Nollendorf-Theater was the Groß-Berlin Theater (later the Ufa-Palast am Zoo) which was converted into a kino-vaudeville cinema, where the architect was again Oscar Kaufmann.

Banco di Roma 

Assertions that the Pope's money was involved in the building of the Nollendorf , appear to be based on more than mere rumour. The Banco di Roma was co-founded in 1880 by Ernesto Pacelli, who soon had the confidence of Pope Leo XIII. According to John F. Pollard , "It would [...] be no exaggeration to say that the Pacellis were the most important family to be associated with the Papacy since the Borgias."

The Società Italiana Cines was founded in Rome in April 1906, and Pacelli became a director before August 1910. The Banco di Roma. apparently speculating with Papal funds, was also running dubious bank-owned enterprises in Tripoli and Salonika (and possibly perhaps Mogadishu, Somalia). Joe Goldsoll seems to have become involved with Cines in around 1912, and if there is any truth in the rumours that the Nollendorf-Theater was "paid for by the Pope's money", they would probably revolve around the fact that a hard-gambling, high-class con man and swindler and the president of a bank which was a quarter owned by the Vatican were both directors of closely linked film and theatre companies.

Unfortunately, the bank was in deep trouble by 1914, having suffered severe losses arising out of the Italo-Turkish War (known in Italy as the Libyan War) of 1911–1912

A contemporary memoir of pre-war Germany summed up the extravagance accompanying the whole corrupt situation:
"Then, only a few months before the war, the whole thing crashed. The exorbitant payment of the writers, musicians, painters, actors, managers, the foolish waste of money caused by the production of certain films, which involved the trailing of whole companies of performers to the most distant corners of the world, hurled the enterprise to inevitable disaster. One bankruptcy followed another, while the ordinary comic and patriotic film and the unpretentious playlet quietly reappeared. The sumptuous palaces were ungilded, became skating rinks, halls for Tango teas, or cabarets."

Collapse of Cines 
Goldsoll severed his connection with Cines in February 1914, buying out the interests of Al. Woods and the Società Italian Cines in the Berlin-based Cines-Theater AG: Woods pulled out of Germany altogether. Goldsoll re-organized his much-reduced assets as the Palast-Theater AG, taking control of the Cines Palast am Zoo and the Cines  cinemas, and leasing the Friedrich-Wilhelm-Städtisches Theater for operetta. 

The Cines Nollendorf-Theater "reverted" to the Società Italiana Cines. A German Cines company was formed, Deutsche Cines GmbH, whose offices occupied the old address of Cines-Theater AG at Friedrichstrasse 11. Goldsoll invested in Ambrosio Film, based in Turin, becoming a director by July 1914.

When World War I broke out in August 1914 Italy was nominally allied with the Central Powers, but remained neutral. The war triggered a general international financial instability, and in the public rush to buy War Bonds, 18.3 million lire were withdrawn from the Banco di Roma between January and March 1914. Italy eventually joined the Triple Entente and declared war on Austria-Hungary in May 1915. The bank continued to haemorrhage its cash deposits and the value of its shares plummeted, despite an emergency loan arranged by Pacelli from the Banco d'Italia. Pacelli resigned as president of the Banco di Roma in September 1915, although he was still personally highly indebted to it. To repay his loans he forfeited his shares in the bank, and was forced to sell his villa.

The investments made by Pacelli and the Banco di Roma suddenly unravelled as depositors continued to withdraw millions of lire: by November 1915 Cines had collapsed, along with the bank's other enterprises in Tripoli and Salonika.

Union-Theater/PAGU

It appears that the Nollendorf-Theater and all the former Cines properties were sold around this time to the Union-Theater (U.T. or U-T Lichtspiele) chain of cinemas, owned by Paul Davidson of PAGU: its name was changed to the Union-Theater Lichtspiele.

Goldsoll's later career

During World War I Goldsoll, a naturalised French citizen, was imprisoned in D.C. Jail in 1917 while Washington District courts decided whether or not to extradite him to France. He faced charges of defrauding the French war-time government out of millions of dollars in commissions on Pierce-Arrow trucks exported to the French War Department. Goldsoll was released on appeal to the US Supreme Court in 1919. Goldsoll invested heavily in Goldwyn Pictures, joining the board of directors in July 1919 and, ousting Samuel Goldwyn to become managing director from 1922 to 1924, turned around the fortunes of the ailing company. Woods joined him on the board as a director.

Ufa 

Along with Messter-Film and Nordisk Film, PAGU was one of the three main companies which formed the nucleus of giant conglomerate Universum-Film AG (Ufa), set up in complete secrecy by the German government as part of its propaganda effort in late 1917. The companies which made up Ufa retained their individual identities for some time, and by 1921 the cinema was known as the U.-T. Nollendorfplatz although it was owned by Universum-Film AG.

The composer Giuseppe Becce conducted the orchestra from 1922, having transferred from the Mozart-Saal at the Neues Schauspielhaus over the road at No. 5 Nollendorfplatz, where he had been since 1915.

The cinema was renamed the Ufa-Theater Nollendorfplatz in 1924, but Ufa was bankrupt by 1925, having spent enormous sums on films like Die Nibelungen and Der letzte Mann. It seems likely that Ufa sold back control of the old Union Theater Lichtspiele cinema chain to its former owner, Paul Davidson, former head of production at Ufa.

Then in December 1925 Ufa announced the so-called Parufamet contract, which gave virtual control of Ufa's first-run theatres (including the Ufa-Theater am Nollendorfplatz) to Paramount and Metro-Goldwyn-Mayer while also granting them 50 percent of income from Ufa's own productions. Two years later Ufa was bought by the right-wing media tycoon Alfred Hugenberg (whose own company Deulig (formerly DLG) had been absorbed into Ufa in 1920), and the cinema received its final name, Ufa-Pavillon in 1927.

Metropolis 

Announcements that Fritz Lang's Metropolis would be shown at the Ufa-Pavillon am Nollendorfplatz had appeared as early as 6 January 1927. The cinema's exterior was coated all over with a shimmery silver paint, and illuminated by floodlights; the statue over the entrance was covered by a huge replica gong which featured towards the end of the film. Metropolis received a double world première on 10 January 1927: a gala première at the Ufa-Palast am Zoo, where the director, film crew and cast were in the audience along with the German President Marx, and a lower-key première at the Ufa-Pavillon am Nollendorplatz.

Most of the press attended the gala performance at the 2,165 seat Ufa-Palast, and this seems to have given rise to the idea that Metropolis only premièred at the Ufa-Palast, along with a brief news item in Ufa's own publicity magazine: "Metropolis was shown with huge success at the Ufa-Palast am Zoo and from the 11th onwards at the Ufa-Pavillon Nollendorfplatz." For example, from a review which appeared the following day: "The film "Metropolis", after its premiere yesterday at the Ufa-Palast am Zoo, will be screened from to-day on at the Ufa Pavilion at the Nollendorfplatz. Many books have since repeated this idea that the première took place on 10 January at the Ufa-Palast only, e.g. "The day after the premiere, it transferred for four months to the UFA-Pavilion at the Nollendorfplatz"

However, at least one journalist did go to the screening at the Ufa-Pavillon am Nollendorfplatz on 10 January and wrote a review concentrating on Gottfried Huppertz's score, which was conducted by Richard Etlinger. This review appeared in the daily Film Kurier the following day, 11 January,  along with a general film review from the UFA-Palast am Zoo.

The film continued to show for about four months at the Ufa-Pavillon, the only cinema in the whole of Germany where it could be seen.

Ufa's own publicity magazine claimed that "Press and public are unanimously thrilled by the grandiose work of cinematography." Although many critics commented favourably on the film's technical achievements, a significant number were singularly unimpressed by the underlying philosophy of the script:

 
Herbert Ihering summed up the single performance at the Ufa-Palast am Zoo: "A great premiere – much applause by the audience for the director Fritz Lang, for the cameraman Karl Freund, for the actors Alfred Abel, Heinrich George and Brigitte Helm. As for the film? No effort spared with brilliant technical detail, but it was wasted on a banal, no longer pertinent idea. The city of the future with the text of a bourgeois past."

Destruction 

The cinema was closed after it was damaged during an RAF bombing raid in 1943. There were 17 large raids on Berlin from November 1943 to the end of January 1944. It seems quite possible that the Ufa-Pavillon was bombed on 22/23 or 23/24 November 1943, right at the start of the Battle of Berlin: "A vast area of destruction stretched from the central districts westwards across the mainly residential districts of Tiergarten and Charlottenburg". Buildings destroyed or severely damaged include: Kaiser Wilhelm Memorial Church and the Gloria-Palast, the Ufa-Palast am Zoo across the square, the Berlin Zoo and much of the Unter den Linden.

The American Church in Berlin (literally next door) was destroyed probably in early 1944.

A block of 1960s era apartments now stands on the site.

See also § External links

Name changes 
 March 1913: Nollendorf-Theater
 May 1913: Cines Nollendorf Theater
 February 1914: Cines Nollendorf Theater
 November 1915: Union Theater Lichtspiele (or U.-T. Lichtspiele).
 1921–23: Union-Theater Nollendorfplatz
 1924: Ufa-Theater am Nollendorfplatz
 1925: Union Theater Lichtspiele.
 1926: Ufa-Theater am Nollendorfplatz
 January 1927–1943: Ufa-Pavillon am Nollendorfplatz

Films shown 

With only 650 seats, the cinema was not generally used as a premier release venue like the much bigger Ufa-Palast am Zoo or the Tauenzien-Palast. Although many films shown there were first runs of some sort, only few of them are particularly well known. The most notable films to show there are Quo Vadis? (1913), F. W. Murnau's Faust (1926) in a pre-release showing, Ben-Hur (1926), and Metropolis (1927); also two of Emil Jannings's early films, Die Augen die Mumie Ma and The Daughter of Mehemed directed by Ernst Lubitsch, and several more by the same director.

Silent films 
 19 March 1913: Quo Vadis? by Enrico Guazzoni (German première)

 11 April 1913:  (aka Kein schön’rer Tod), directed by Emil Albes for Deutsche Bioscope. Double bill with Das gelobte Land, German title of Italian film produced by Cines Rome.
27 June 1913: Max als Torero, with Max Linder.
 25 July 1913:  – Max Linder's first feature film (abendfüllender Spielfilm). International double première with the Paris Olympia
13 July 1913: Max ist ein Katzenfeind , with Max Linder (German première)
15 August 1913: Auf in den Kampf, Torero!, Schlittenschatten, Gebräuche in den Abruzzen, Bliemchens Frauen, Bunny trainiert, Mr. Pyp und sein Flirt. Not necessarily premières, but a typical holiday programme with five shorter films.
4 September 1913: , German première of the Swedish film Den okända by Mauritz Stiller, based on a 1911 play by von Hugo von Hofmannsthal
14 September 1913: Antony and Cleopatra, directed by Guazzoni, with Gianna Terribili-Gonzales and Amleto Novelli
 October 1913:  – documentary about the German Arctic Expedition, led by Herbert Schröder-Stranz (see also )
 1914: Denkende Pferde
13 March 1914: Der goldene Skarabäus (The Golden Scarab)
May 1914: Vendetta di Pagliaccio (Die Geschichte eines Pierrot), with Emilio Ghione, distributed by Cines. German première.
5 June 1914: , with Henry Bender
 30 October 1914: Otto heiratet, directed by Heinrich Bolten-Baeckers with Otto Reutter (BB-Film)
 30 October 1914: Sanitätshunde im Kriegsdienste. Documentary.
 October? 1914: Der Schuss, . German première? of Swedish film directed by Mauritz Stiller, produced by :sv:Svenska Biografteatern, with Egil Eide, Jenny Tschernichin-Larsson.
27 November 1914: Sie kann nicht nein sagen, directed by Nunek Danuky, with Margret Fischbach, script by Richard Oswald.
December 1914: Jungdeutschland, a film about war in the air, directed by Heinrich Bolten-Baeckers with Leo Peukert
 28 May 1915:  (Blind's Man Bluff), directed by and starring Ernst Lubitsch, with Ressel Orla. Produced by PAGU
July 1915: , the first of the Joe Deebs detective series which Joe May directed after splitting with Ernst Reicher and leaving Continental-Kunstfilm in 1914, starring Max Landa and Ellen Richter.
 15 October 1915: , the second Joe Deebs film, with Max Landa and Joe May's wife Mia May.
26 November 1915: , by Joe May with Max Landa (Joe Deebs #3)
9 June 1916: Shoe Palace Pinkus, comedy directed by Ernst Lubitsch, with Guido Herzfeld, Ernst Lubitsch and Ossi Oswalda. Also premièred at U.T. Kurfürstendamm (Filmbühne Wien).
March 1917: Das Nachtgespräch, with Erich Kaiser-Titz, produced by Greenbaum-Film
16 November 1917: When Four Do the Same, directed by Ernst Lubitsch, with Emil Jannings, Ossi Oswalda, and Margarete Kupfer. Also premiered at the U. T. Kurfürstendamm (Filmbühne Wien).
28 September 1918: Diary of a Lost Woman, directed by Richard Oswald with Erna Morena, Conrad Veidt and Werner Krauß. Double première with the UT Kurfürstendamm (Filmbühne Wien).
3 October 1918: Die Augen der Mumie Ma, directed by Ernst Lubitsch, with Pola Negri, Emil Jannings, and Harry Liedtke
13 December 1918: Jettchen Geberts Geschichte, Part II (Henriette Jacoby) directed by Richard Oswald with Conrad Veidt.
19 December 1918: The Pied Piper of Hamelin, starring and directed by Paul Wegener for PAGU, with Lyda Salmonova and Elsa Wagner.
 1919: Das Werk seiner Lebens, directed by Adolf Gärtner for Greenbaum-Film, with Albert Bassermann, Else Bassermann, and Gertrude Welcker. Camera: Mutz Greenbaum.
17 January 1919: Meyer aus Berlin, directed by Ernst Lubitsch, starring Lubitsch and Ossi Oswalda.
July 1919: Die Sünderin, directed by Leo Lasko with Ernst Hofmann
15 August 1919: The Daughter of Mehemed, directed by Alfred Halm, with Ellen Richter, Harry Liedtke and Emil Jannings
September 1919: Bis früh um fünfe, directed by Heinrich Bolten-Baeckers
November 1919: De profundis, directed by Georg Jacoby, with Ellen Richter, Magnus Stifter and Emil Rameau
21 April 1920: Ganz ohne Männer geht die Chose nicht, directed by 
June 1920: S. M. der Reisende (His Majesty the Tourist)
 2 July 1920: Brigantenliebe, directed by Martin Hartwig, with Ellen Richter, Hans Adalbert Schlettow and Emil Rameau
August 1920: Der verbotene Weg (1919), directed by Henrik Galeen with John Gottowt
October 1920: Tyrannei des Todes, directed by and starring Friedrich Feher
15 October 1920: Die Dame in Schwarz, another Joe Deebs detective film
23 September 1921: The Adventure of Doctor Kircheisen, directed by Rudolf Biebrach, script by Robert Wiene.
30 September 1921 The Story of Christine von Herre, directed by Ludwig Berger with Agnes Straub, Werner Krauss and Paul Hartmann.
2 April 1922:  Die Grundlagen der Einsteinschen Relativitäts-Theorie, directed by Hanns Walter Kornblum. Documentary with animation and accompanying lecture. Some footage was included in The Einstein Theory of Relativity (1923) by Max and Dave Fleischer.
18 August 1922: Zweite Heimat, directed by John W. Brunius, with Nils Lundell Paul Seelig, Tore Svennberg and Pauline Brunius.
10 November 1924: Three Wise Fools, directed by King Vidor for Goldwyn Pictures, whose president was Joe Goldsoll (German première)
26 August 1926: Faust, directed by F. W. Murnau. Apparently a single pre-release showing. Faust premièred with new subtitles at the Ufa-Palast am Zoo on 14 October 1926.
 7 September 1926: Ben-Hur: A Tale of the Christ directed by Fred Niblo (European première)
 10 January – 13 May 1927: Metropolis, double première with the Ufa-Palast am Zoo.
 20 March 1928: the 1928 Winter Olympics documentary The White Stadium  (Das weiße Stadion), directed by Arnold Fanck.
 10 September 1928: The Student Prince in Old Heidelberg, directed by Ernst Lubitsch for MGM, with Ramón Novarro, Norma Shearer and Philippe De Lacy (Berlin première)
 12 November 1928: Villa Falconieri, a German-Italian film directed by Richard Oswald.
 10 January 1929: Om Mane Padmi Hum, documentary about Tibet
 12 March 1929: Pori – Ein Film aus dem Afrikanischen Busch, drama/documentary film directed by  Freiherr (Baron) Adolph von Dungern.
 6 June 1929: Pamir – das Dach der Welt (German première), documentary about the 1928 German-Soviet Alay-Pamir Expedition to climb Lenin Peak, directed by Vladimir Schneiderov, with mountaineers Karl Wien,  and the Austrian .
 19 July 1929: Emden III fährt um die Welt, documentary about the German cruiser Emden. Berlin premiere.
 26 August 1929: With Cobham to the Cape, directed by Alan Cobham, of Flying Circus fame (Berlin première)
 3 September 1929: Ich lebe für Dich, directed by Wilhelm Dieterle, produced by Joe Pasternak, music by Willy Schmidt-Gentner.
 17 September 1929: The Ship of Lost Souls, directed by Maurice Tourneur, with Marlene Dietrich, Fritz Kortner, and Robin Irvine

Sound film era 
 8 October 1929: The River, a part-talkie directed by Frank Borzage, produced by William Fox.
 14 October 1929: "Charlies Karriere": The Rink; Behind the Screen; The Fireman; and The Cure, four silent two-reelers all starring and directed by Charlie Chaplin for Mutual Film in 1916–17.
7 November 1929: Napoleon at Saint Helena, silent film directed by Lupu Pick, with Werner Krauß and Albert Bassermann.
 12 December 1929: The League of Three, silent film directed by Hans Behrendt with Jenny Jugo, camera by Werner Brandes, music by Willy Schmidt-Gentner.
 20 December 1929: White Shadows in the South Seas (1928), directed by W. S. Van Dyke for Cosmopolitan Productions, distributed by MGM. First MGM film with pre-recorded music and sound effects (but no dialogue), and the first to feature the roar of Leo the Lion at the beginning.
23 December 1930: Africa Speaks! (Afrika spricht!), an early all-sound 'talkie' US documentary by Walter Futter about an American wildlife expedition to Africa. Camera: Paul L. Hoefler, narration by Lowell Thomas. Available complete on Youtube. Also shown at the 'Universum'.
2 April 1931: The Street Song (Gassenhauer), directed by Lupu Pick.
16 February 1933:  (The Island of Demons) by 
 3 March 1933: Am Horst der wilden Adler Documentary, 96 min., directed by 
 14 December 1934: Der Firmling, with Karl Valentin and Liesl Karlstadt.
 14 December 1934: Schach der Eva, directed by Ludwig Schmid-Wildy, produced by Arya-Film.
 23 December 1935: The White Hell of Piz Palü, directed by Arnold Fanck and Georg Wilhelm Pabst, with Leni Riefenstahl and Ernst Udet. Music by Willy Schmidt-Gentner. World première of the German sound version. 91 mins., (original silent version 1929).
 14 April 1937: Victims of the Past (Opfer der Vergangenheit), a NSDAP propaganda film, shown in every cinema in Germany.
3 October 1937: The Tale of the Fox, a Russian 1930 animated feature film with added soundtrack, directed by Ladislas Starevich.

Namesake 
References to the 'Berliner Theater am Nollendorfplatz' in the 1930s mentioning Erwin Piscator, Berthold Brecht, Gustav von Wangenheim, Hans Meyer-Hanno and others, probably refer to the Neues Schauspielhaus at 5 Nollendorfplatz. The building also included a cinema, the Mozartsaal, converted from a concert hall.

See also 

Literary, artistic, architectural and cultural events in 1913

Architecture
 City Federal Building, Birmingham, Alabama
 Grand Central Terminal, New York City, opened after rebuilding
 The Woolworth Building in Manhattan opened
Mathematics
 Alfred North Whitehead and Bertrand Russell – Principia Mathematica completed
Art
 The Armory Show ran in New York City from February 17 – March 15
 Kazimir Malevich – a Black Square appeared in scenery designs by for the Futurist opera Victory over the Sun
Literature
 Alain-Fournier – Le Grand Meaulnes
 Guillaume Apollinaire – Alcools
 Joseph Conrad – Chance
 Manuel de Falla – La vida breve
 Sigmund Freud – Totem und Tabu
 D. H. Lawrence – Sons and Lovers
 Marcel Proust – Swann's Way, the first volume of A la recherche du temps perdu
 Siegfried Sassoon – The Daffodil Murderer
Music
 Alexander Scriabin – the last two piano sonatas
 Igor Stravinsky – The Rite of Spring (May 29)

References 
Original German text

Notes

Citations

Sources

External links 
 Photo of Oskar Kaufmann at Architectuul.com/Architects
 View of the Nollendorfplatz, dated (probably incorrectly) 1931: U-Bahn station (l.), Theater am Nollendorfplatz (c.), Ufa-Pavillon (r.) below the tower of the American Church in Berlin (destroyed in 1944); the Ufa logo is in the centre of the mansard roof. Die Veilchen der Kaiserin (is showing at the Ufa-Pavillon, which was only released on 16 December 1932.
 Schöneberg Ufa-Pavillon am Nollendorfplatz (UT-Lichtspiele, Cines) (in German)
 Photos of the Nollendorfplatz and the Gloria-Palast in flames 16 January 1943 – 30 April 1945, nos. 1010590640 and 1010590642. Ullsteinbild.de NB very commercial site.
 

Buildings and structures completed in 1913
1943 disestablishments in Germany
Cinemas in Germany
Entertainment venues in Germany
Buildings and structures in Berlin destroyed during World War II
Former cinemas